On 15 April 2019, just before 18:20 CEST, a structural fire broke out beneath the roof of Notre-Dame de Paris, a medieval Catholic cathedral in Paris, France. By the time the fire was extinguished, the cathedral's spire had collapsed, most of its roof had been destroyed, and its upper walls were severely damaged. Extensive damage to the interior was prevented by its vaulted stone ceiling, which largely contained the burning roof as it collapsed. Many works of art and religious relics were moved to safety early in the emergency, but others suffered smoke damage, and some of the exterior art was damaged or destroyed. The cathedral's altar, two pipe organs, and three 13th-century rose windows suffered little or no damage. Three emergency workers were injured. The fire contaminated the site and nearby areas of the city with toxic dust and lead. The cathedral did not host a Christmas Mass in 2019 due to the fire, marking it the first time since 1803 that a Mass had not been held.

French president Emmanuel Macron stated in the spring of 2022 that the cathedral would be restored by 2024, announcing that a fundraising campaign had brought in pledges of over €1billion . A complete restoration could require five years. If completed on this timeline, the cathedral could be restored in time for the 2024 Summer Olympics in Paris.

Background 
The Catholic cathedral of Notre-Dame de Paris ("Our Lady of Paris"), part of the "Paris, Banks of the Seine" UNESCO World Heritage Site, was begun in the 12th century. Its walls and interior vaulted ceiling are of stone; its roof and flèche (spire) were of wood (much of it 13th-century oak), sheathed in lead to exclude water. The spire was rebuilt several times, most recently in the 19th century.

The cathedral's stonework has been severely eroded by years of weather and pollution, and the spire had extensively rotted because fissures in its lead sheathing were admitting water. The roof timbers were dry, spongy and powdery with age. In 2014, the Ministry of Culture estimated needed renovations at €150million, and in 2016 the Archdiocese of Paris launched an appeal to raise €100million over the following five to ten years. At the time of the fire, the spire was undergoing restoration and scaffolding was being erected over the transept.

Extensive attention had been given to the risk of fire at the cathedral. The Paris Fire Brigade drilled regularly to prepare for emergencies there, including on-site exercises in 2018; a firefighter was posted to the cathedral each day; and fire wardens checked conditions beneath the roof three times daily.

Fire

Fire broke out in the attic beneath the cathedral's roof at 18:18. At 18:20 the fire alarm sounded and guards evacuated the cathedral; a guard was sent to investigate, but to the wrong the attic of the adjoining where he found no fire. About fifteen minutes later the error was discovered, but by the time guards had climbed the three hundred steps to the cathedral attic the fire was well advanced. The alarm system was not designed to automatically notify the fire brigade, which was summoned at 18:51 after the guards had returned. Firefighters arrived within ten minutes.

Police evacuated the Île de la Cité. White smoke was seen rising from the roof, which turned black before flames appeared from the spire, then turned yellow.

Firefighting

More than 400 firefighters were engaged; another hundred government workers worked to move precious objects to safety via a human chain also including police and municipal workers.

The fire was primarily fought from inside the structure, which was more dangerous for personnel but reduced potential damage to the cathedral; applying water from outside risked deflecting flames and hot gases (at temperatures up to 800°C or 1500°F) inwards. Deluge guns were used at lower-than-usual pressures to minimise damage to the cathedral and its contents, with  water that was supplied by pump-boat from the Seine.

Aerial firefighting was not used because water dropped from heights could have caused structural damage, and heated stone can crack if suddenly cooled. Helicopters were not used because of dangerous updrafts but drones were used for visual and thermal imaging, and robots for visual imaging and directing water streams. Molten lead falling from the roof posed a special hazard for firefighters.

By 18:52, smoke was visible from outside; flames appeared in the next ten minutes, as firefighters arrived. The spire of the cathedral collapsed at 19:50, creating a draft that slammed all the doors and sent a fireball through the attic. Firefighters then retreated from within the attic. Shortly before the spire fell, the fire had spread to the wooden framework inside the north tower, which supported eight very large bells. Had the bells fallen, it was thought that the damage done as they fell could have collapsed the towers, and with them the entire cathedral. At 20:30, firefighters abandoned attempts to extinguish the roof and concentrated on saving the towers, fighting from within and between the towers. By 21:45 the fire was under control.

Adjacent apartment buildings were evacuated owing to concern about possible collapse, but on 19 April the fire brigade ruled out that risk. One firefighter and two police officers were injured.

Damage

Most of the wood/metal roof and the spire of the cathedral was destroyed, with about one third of the roof remaining. The remnants of the roof and spire fell atop the stone vault underneath, which forms the ceiling of the cathedral's interior. Some sections of this vaulting collapsed in turn, allowing debris from the burning roof to fall to the marble floor below, but most sections remained intact owing to the use of rib vaulting, greatly reducing damage to the cathedral's interior and objects within.

The cathedral contained a large number of artworks, religious relics, and other irreplaceable treasures, including a crown of thorns said to be the one Jesus wore at his crucifixion, a purported piece of the cross on which Jesus was crucified, the Tunic of St. Louis, a much-rebuilt pipe organ by Aristide Cavaillé-Coll, and the 14th-century Virgin of Paris statue.

Some artwork had been removed in preparation for the renovations, and most of the cathedral's sacred relics were held in the adjoining sacristy, which the fire did not reach; all the cathedral's relics survived. Some contents were moved by a human chain of emergency workers and civil servants. Many valuables that were not removed also survived, but the state of many others remained unknown as of 16 April.

Lead joints in some of the 19th-century stained-glass windows melted, but the three major rose windows, dating to the 13th century, were undamaged. One weakened window may need to be dismantled for safekeeping. Several pews were destroyed and the vaulted arches were blackened by smoke, though the church's main cross and altar survived, along with the statues surrounding it.

Some paintings, apparently only smoke-damaged, are expected to be transported to the Louvre for restoration. A number of statues, including those of the twelve Apostles at the base of the spire, had been removed in preparation for renovations. The rooster-shaped reliquary atop the spire was found damaged but intact among the debris. The three pipe organs were not significantly damaged. The largest of the cathedral's bells, the bourdon, was not damaged. The liturgical treasury of the cathedral and the "grands Mays" paintings were moved to safety.

Environmental damage
Airparif said winds rapidly dispersed the smoke, carrying it away aloft along the Seine corridor. It did not find elevated levels of particulate air pollution at monitoring stations nearby. The Paris police have stated that there was no danger from breathing the air around the fire.

The burned-down roof had been covered with over 400 metric tons of lead. Settling dust substantially raised surface lead levels in some places nearby, notably the cordoned-off area and places left open during the fire. Wet cleaning for surfaces and blood tests for children and pregnant women were recommended in the immediate area. People working on the cathedral after the fire did not initially take the lead precautions required for their own protection; materials leaving the site were decontaminated, but some clothing was not, and some precautions were not correctly followed; as a result, the worksite failed some inspections and was temporarily shut down. There was also more widespread contamination; testing, cleanup, and public health advisories were delayed for months, and the neighbourhood was not decontaminated for four months, prompting widespread criticism.

Average lead levels in Paris streets are normally five times the indoor legal limit owing to historic uses of lead, principally from runoff from intact roofs. The Health Ministry rules that children should not be exposed to more than 70 micrograms/m2 indoors. There is no legal limit for outdoor lead levels, which are often very heterogeneous; the L'Agence régionale de santé (ARS) d'Ile-de-France is not certain if some of the elevated levels being measured are connected to the fire. This lack of clarity and threshold-linked mandatory measures may have delayed action. In mid-July, regional health officials raised their outdoor guideline from 1000 micrograms/m2 to 5000. Rain can redistribute the lead dust. Samples of honey collected in July 2019 revealed higher lead concentrations down wind from Notre Dame and lead isotopes tagged the lead as originating from the fire and not other potential sources of pollutants.

Reactions

Macron, postponing a speech to address the yellow vests movement planned for that evening, went to Notre Dame and gave a brief address there. Major religious leaders and representatives of numerous countries and international organisations extended condolences.

Through the night of the fire and into the next day, people gathered along the Seine to hold vigils, sing and pray. Some commentators found deeper meaning in the fire, linking it with divine judgment or the decline of Western civilisation.

The following Sunday at Saint-Eustache Church, the Archbishop of Paris, Michel Aupetit, honoured the firefighters with the presentation of a book of scriptures saved from the fire.

Investigation

On 16 April, the Paris prosecutor said there was no evidence of a deliberate act.

The fire has been compared to the similar 1992 Windsor Castle fire and the Uppark fire, among others, and has raised old questions about the safety of similar structures and the techniques used to restore them. Renovation works increase fire risk, and a police source reported they are looking into whether such work had caused this incident.

The renovations presented a fire risk from sparks, short-circuits, and heat from welding (roof repairs involved cutting, and soldering lead sheets resting on timber). Normally, no electrical installations were allowed in the roof space because of the extreme fire risk. The roof framing was of very dry timber, often powdery with age. After the fire the architect responsible for fire safety at the cathedral acknowledged that the rate at which fire might spread had been underestimated, and experts said it was well known that a fire in the roof would be almost impossible to control.

Of the firms working on the restoration, a Europe Echafaudage team was the only one working there on the day of the fire; the company said no soldering or welding was underway before the fire. The scaffolding was receiving electrical supply for temporary elevators and lighting. The roofers, Le Bras Frères, said it had followed procedure and that none of its personnel were on site when the fire broke out. Time-lapse images taken by a camera installed by them showed smoke first rising from the base of the spire.

On 25 April, the structure was considered safe enough for entry of investigators, who unofficially stated that they were considering theories involving malfunction of electric bell-ringing apparatus, and cigarette butts discovered on the renovation scaffolding. Le Bras Frères confirmed its workers had smoked cigarettes, contrary to regulations, but denied that a cigarette butt could have started the fire. The Paris prosecutor's office announced on 26 June that no evidence had been found to suggest a criminal motive.

The security employee monitoring the alarm system was new on the job, and was on a second eight-hour shift that day because his relief had not arrived. Additionally, the fire security system used confusing terminology in its referencing parts of the cathedral, which contributed to the initial confusion as to the location of the fire.

As of September, determining the exact place in which the fire started was expected to take a great deal more time and work. By 15 April 2020, investigators believed "the fire to have been started by either a cigarette or a short circuit in the electrical system".

Reconstruction

On the night of the fire, Macron said that the cathedral would be rebuilt, and launched an international fundraising campaign. France's cathedrals have been owned by the state since 1905, and are not privately insured.

The heritage conservation organisation Fondation du Patrimoine estimated the damage in the hundreds of millions of euros. Although art in the building and multiple construction companies were insured, according to President Robert Leblanc, losses from the fire are not expected to substantially impact the private insurance industry. European art insurers stated the cost would be similar to ongoing renovations of the Palace of Westminster in London, which was estimated to be around €7billion. This cost does not include damage to any of the artwork or artefacts within the cathedral; art insurers said any pieces on loan from other museums would have been insured, but the works owned by the cathedral would not have been insurable.

While Macron hoped the cathedral could be restored in time for the 2024 Summer Olympics in Paris, architects expect the work could take from 20 to 40 years, as any new structure would need to balance restoring the look of the original building, using wood and stone sourced from the same regions used in the original construction, with the structural reinforcement required for preventing a similar disaster in the future.

There is discussion of whether to reconstruct the cathedral in modified form. Rebuilding the roof with titanium sheets and steel trusses has been suggested; other options include rebuilding in the original lead and wood, rebuilding with modern materials not visible from the outside (like the reinforced concrete trusses at Reims Cathedral), or a combination of restored old elements and newly designed ones.

French prime minister Édouard Philippe announced an architectural design competition for a new spire "adapted to the techniques and the challenges of our era." The spire replacement project has gathered a variety of designs and some controversy, particularly its legal exemption from environmental and heritage rules. After the design competition was announced, the French senate amended the government's restoration bill to require the roof to be restored to how it was before the fire. This amendment awaits approval by the National Assembly of France. On 16 July, 95 days after the fire that destroyed the cathedral's roof and central spire, the law that will govern the restoration of the cathedral was finally approved by the French parliament. It recognises its UNESCO World Heritage Site status and the need to respect existing international charters and practices, to "preserve the historic, artistic and architectural history of the monument", and to limit any derogations to the existing heritage, planning, environmental and construction codes to a minimum.

On 15 April 2020, Germany offered to restore "some of the large clerestory windows located far above eye level" with three expert tradesmen who specialize in rebuilding cathedrals. Monika Grütters, Germany's Commissioner for Culture, was quoted as saying "her country would shoulder the costs".

On 18 April 2020, French game developer and publisher Ubisoft offered to provide the reconstruction effort with over 5,000 hours' worth of research on the building's structure, previously used to recreate the cathedral in the 2014 video game Assassin's Creed Unity.

As of 30 November 2020, all of the tangled scaffolding was removed from the spire area. It is no longer a threat to the building.

On 15 April 2022, French president Emmanuel Macron visited the cathedral as the country marked the third anniversary of the fire. Macron toured the site where works are being carried out to restore the iconic landmark and spoke to those undertaking the project about their progress so far. 

In the spring of 2022, eight workshops of master glassmakers and locksmiths, selected across France, began the process of cleaning and restoration of the cathedral’s stained glass windows. The Cologne Cathedral workshop from Germany joined the effort by restoring a four of the stained glass windows.

Notre Dame is currently scheduled to reopen in 2024, five years to the day of the fire and the year Paris will host the 2024 Summer Olympics.

Fundraising
, donations of over €1billion have been pledged for the cathedral's reconstruction, at least €880million of that in less than a day after Macron's appeal.
Pledges €10M and over include:

There have been many additional pledges for smaller, or undisclosed, amounts. A proposal by former minister Jean-Jacques Aillagon that corporate donations for Notre-Dame should get a 90% tax deduction (rather than the standard 60%) was retracted after public outcry. Some donors have said they will not seek tax deductions. Donors exempted of income tax (more than half of French taxpayers, including working- and middle-class) are not eligible for such deductions.

, only €80million had been collected. The minister in charge of national museums and monuments, Franck Riester, predicted that further donations would materialise as reconstruction work progressed, though it was reported that some who made pledges have renounced them because fundraising has been so successful. A year after the fire, close to €1 billion had been received from around 320,000 contributors.

The current status of the restoration is posted regularly by the organisation the Friends of Notre-Dame de Paris.

References in modern culture

 Notre-Dame on Fire, a 2022 disaster film based on the Notre-Dame de Paris fire

See also

 Construction and renovation fires
 1984 York Minster fire
 List of building or structure fires
 List of destroyed heritage
 List of fires at major places of worship

Notes

References

External links

 Notre-Dame de Paris – official site
 Friends of Notre-Dame de Paris – official 501(c)(3) charity leading the international fundraising efforts to rebuild and restore Notre-Dame Cathedral
 NOVA Series TV Show from PBS – Saving Notre Dame - Scientists and engineers fight to save Notre Dame Cathedral after the 2019 fire
 NOVA Series TV Show from PBS – Saving Notre Dame's Flying Buttresses – Engineers install supports to the 14 Flying Buttresses to prevent their collapse after the 2019 fire; these supports stabilized the structure to allow for work on the interior – 3 minutes
 Before the Fire: Notre-Dame de Paris in Pictures

4th arrondissement of Paris
2019 fires in Europe
2019 in Christianity
2019 in Paris
April 2019 events in France
Articles containing video clips
Building and structure fires in France
Building collapses in 2019
Fires in Paris
Notre-Dame de Paris
Paris Fire Brigade
Church fires
2019 disasters in France